Star Wars Rebels is an American 3D CGI animated television series produced by Lucasfilm and Lucasfilm Animation. Beginning fourteen years after Revenge of the Sith and five years before A New Hope, Rebels takes place during an era when the Galactic Empire is securing its grip on the galaxy. Imperial forces are hunting down the last of the Jedi Knights while a fledgling rebellion against the Empire is taking form.

The series was previewed throughout August 2014 with a set of shorts introducing the main characters before the television film pilot episode premiered on Disney Channel on October 3, 2014. The regular series premiered on Disney XD on October 13, 2014. The second season started on June 20, 2015, and the third season premiered on September 24, 2016. The two-part season three finale aired on March 25, 2017. On March 31, it was announced that the show would return for a fourth season. On April 15, executive producer Dave Filoni announced that the fourth season would also be the final season. On September 2, 2017, a second trailer for season four was released during a panel at Fan Expo in Canada, and the date for the season's premiere was announced as October 16, 2017.

Season 4 premiered on October 16, 2017, with the two-part episode "Heroes of Mandalore", and continued to air until November 13, 2017. The series picked up on February 19, 2018, after a winter break and preparations for the release of the film Star Wars: The Last Jedi. Disney XD then proceeded to release two episodes a week, before airing the final two episodes on March 5, 2018. A total of 75 episodes were aired.

Series overview

Episodes

Shorts (2014)

Season 1 (2014–15)

Season 2 (2015–16)

Season 3 (2016–17)

Season 4 (2017–18)

References

Episodes
Rebels episodes
Lists of American children's animated television series episodes